The Business Names Act 1985 was an Act of the Parliament of the United Kingdom. It has since been repealed.

See also 
 Companies Act 2006
 Company, Limited Liability Partnership and Business (Names and Trading Disclosures) Regulations 2015

References 

United Kingdom Acts of Parliament 1985
Repealed United Kingdom Acts of Parliament
Law of the United Kingdom